Te Mana O Te Ra ("The Power of The Sun") is a photovoltaic power station at Rarotonga International Airport in the Cook Islands. It is the largest solar power station in the Cook Islands. It is owned and operated by Te Aponga Uira.

The array consists of 3051 solar panels and has a peak output of 960 kW. It was funded by the New Zealand Ministry of Foreign Affairs and constructed between June and September 2014 by New Zealand company Infratec Renewables Ltd. It was commissioned by Cook Islands Prime Minister Henry Puna in October 2014.

In 2017 the farm was upgraded by the addition of a 5.6 MWh battery storage system.

Electricity generated by Te Mana O Te Ra is injected into the local distribution grid via an onsite 11,000V transformer. At peak output it can supply approximately 5% of Rarotonga's electricity demand.

References

Avarua
Photovoltaic power stations in the Cook Islands
Buildings and structures in the Cook Islands